Heping Station is a railway station on the Taiwan Railways Administration North-link line located in Xiulin Township, Hualien County, Taiwan.

History
The station was opened on 8 February 1979.

Around the station 
 Hoping Power Plant

See also
 List of railway stations in Taiwan

References

1979 establishments in Taiwan
Railway stations in Hualien County
Railway stations opened in 1979
Railway stations served by Taiwan Railways Administration